Felisberto Fortes (13 December 1927 – 21 September 2013) was a Portuguese rower. He competed at the 1948 Summer Olympics and the 1952 Summer Olympics.

References

1927 births
2013 deaths
Portuguese male rowers
Olympic rowers of Portugal
Rowers at the 1948 Summer Olympics
Rowers at the 1952 Summer Olympics
Place of birth missing